Tralee is a planned suburb of Queanbeyan, New South Wales. It lies south of Jerrabomberra and the site once planned for the future city of Environa. It was named after Tralee in Ireland.

The residential site, which falls under the flight path of Canberra Airport was strongly opposed by airport authorities. However, despite the concerns, the New South Wales State Planning Minister Kristina Keneally initially approved Queanbeyan City Council's plan for the development of 5000 residential blocks in 2008. In November 2012 the New South Wales Government announced that it had approved the rezoning of the land.  Protests have continued by the airport, federal Labor politicians and the ACT Government.

Geography
Tralee lies on the lower slopes of the Pemberton Hill to the south. The rocks are acid volcanics, rhyodacite and rhyolite from the Deakin Volcanics. These rocks solidified 414±9 Mya.

References

Towns in New South Wales
Queanbeyan